Benjamín Cardona  (born 17 July 1957 in La Unión, Valle del Cauca) is a Colombian former football player, mostly known as "Mincho".

Club career
Cardona played as a forward and began his career in Deportivo Pereira. He scored 21 goals for the club during the 1979 season.

International career
He played for Colombia at the 1980 Olympic Games in the Soviet Union.

References

1957 births
Living people
Colombian footballers
Footballers at the 1980 Summer Olympics
Olympic footballers of Colombia
Deportivo Pereira footballers
Atlético Nacional footballers
Association football forwards
Sportspeople from Valle del Cauca Department